Sylvie Cachay (—December 9, 2010) was a Peruvian American swimsuit designer who was strangled and drowned in an overflowing bathtub at the Soho House hotel in Manhattan on December 9, 2010. Nicholas Brooks, her boyfriend of six months, was convicted of her second degree murder in July 2013 and sentenced to 25 years to life on September 23, 2013.

Early life & relationship 
Cachay was born in Arlington, Virginia, to Dr. Antonio Cachay, a surgeon and otolaryngologist, and Sylvia Cachay, a painter. Sylvie Cachay was Peruvian American and held dual citizenship between both countries, growing up in both Lima and Arlington. 

She received her degree in fashion design from Marymount College. She worked as a designer for both Marc Jacobs and Tommy Hilfiger before joining the design team of Victoria’s Secret and becoming their head swimsuit designer. She worked there until 2006, when she left to start her own line of swimsuits, Syla. Sports Illustrated featured her designs in their swimsuit video. The company also appeared in numerous magazines, including Elle, InStyle, and Vogue. She finally went out of business in 2008 due to the Great Recession.

Relationship with Nicholas Brooks 
Cachay met Nicholas Brooks, the son of songwriter Joseph Brooks, in June 2010. Brooks had dropped out of college and was struggling to remain employed. The two bonded after one of Sylvie's toy poodles was hit by a car. However, their relationship was volatile, as they frequently broke up, made amends, and got back together. A friend of Cachay's, Alicia Bell, later testified that "as long as I've known her, she's never been in a relationship this dramatic".

Death 
Cachay and Brooks arrived at the Soho House hotel at around 12:30 AM on December 9, 2010. Cachay explained to the clerk at the front desk that her “stoner” boyfriend had accidentally set fire to their apartment after leaving lit candles behind the bed while he was high on drugs. They were able to put out the fire, but did not want to stay in the apartment due to the smoky smell. She also told the clerk that she was tired and unable to stay awake after she had taken a Xanax. A concierge was appointed to assist her to Room 20. The concierge later recounted that as she left the room, she had heard Cachay and Brooks arguing.

Discovery of body 
Around 2:00 AM, the hotel staff received multiple complaints of water dripping through the floor of Room 20. They knocked on the door and nobody answered. Letting themselves into the room, they discovered 33-year-old Cachay's body submerged in an overflowing bathtub. She was wearing nothing but a turtleneck sweater, pink underwear, and a Rolex watch. Despite efforts to revive her, paramedics pronounced her dead on the scene at 3:33 AM. The police, examining her body, found wounds on her neck that were consistent with strangulation, hemorrhaging in her eyes, and a bite mark on her hand.

Autopsy 
The initial autopsy conducted on Cachay's body proved inconclusive. After both a tissue and toxicology test were performed, the medical examiner ruled her death a homicide, stating that Cachay had been held underwater in the bathtub and strangled.

Investigation & trial 

Immediately after the discovery of Cachay’s body, Brooks was questioned by the police. He told them that he ran into someone he knew in the lobby of the hotel and they went off to buy drinks. He was arrested and charged with her death on December 9 after the police obtained a warrant to search his body for DNA evidence; the investigators found his DNA on the faucet in the bathtub where Cachay was killed.

During the trial, friends of Cachay revealed that Brooks had been hiring prostitutes while dating her, sometimes using her credit card to do so; she became aware of this shortly before her death. Within 24 hours of the murder, she had sent Brooks an email with the header "fuck you", confronting him about the suspicious withdrawals from her credit card and threatening to report him to the police.

He pled not guilty to the charges, but was found guilty of second-degree murder and convicted in July 2013. He was sentenced to 25 years to life in prison. According to presiding Judge Bonnie Wittner, she could have sentenced Brooks to 15 years to life, but instead selected the higher punishment, stating that the murder was a “singularly horrific and tragic event”. Since his conviction, Brooks has been housed in Fallsburg, New York, at the Sullivan Correctional Facility.

On March 22, 2018, in a unanimous ruling by the New York Court of Appeals, Brooks lost his final appeal against his murder conviction. The court noted that both security camera footage and the presence of Brook’s DNA in the hotel bathroom placed him at the Soho House directly before the discovery of Cachay’s body. He will be eligible for parole in 2038.

References 

2010s crimes in New York City
2010 murders in the United States
December 2010 crimes in the United States
Murder in New York City
Crimes against women